Megalodoras guayoensis is a species of thorny catfish endemic to Venezuela where it occurs in the Orinoco River basin.  This species grows to a length of  SL.

References 
 

Doradidae
Fish of South America
Fish described in 1968